Peter F. Hamilton (born 1960) is a British author. He is known for writing science fiction space opera.

Biography 
Peter F. Hamilton was born in Rutland in 1960. He did not attend university.  He said in an interview, "I did science at school up to age eighteen, I stopped doing English, English literature, writing at sixteen, I just wasn't interested in those days".

After he started writing in 1987, he sold his first short story to Fear Magazine in 1988. His first novel, Mindstar Rising, was published during 1993, followed by A Quantum Murder and The Nano Flower.

He then wrote a space opera novel, named The Night's Dawn Trilogy. He has also published the Commonwealth Saga with Void Trilogy and The Chronicle of the Fallers in the same universe.

Since 2018, he has written the unrelated space opera Salvation Sequence, and young adult sci-fi Arkship Trilogy, set in original universes.

Awards
Hamilton received the Inkpot Award in 2012).

Bibliography

References

External links

 The Unisphere | A Peter F. Hamilton Fan Site
 

1960 births
20th-century English novelists
21st-century English novelists
English male novelists
English science fiction writers
Living people
People from Rutland
Inkpot Award winners